Adlin Mair-Clarke (15 November 1941 – 6 April 2020) was an athlete from Jamaica specializing in hurdles and sprinting. She was born Adlin Victoria Mair in Manchester Parish, Jamaica. Mair-Clarke participated in the British Empire & Commonwealth Games in 1962, 1966 and 1970 as well as the Olympic Games in 1964 and 1968.

Mair-Clarke died from COVID-19 in 2020.

References

External links 
 

1941 births
2020 deaths
Sportspeople from Kingston, Jamaica
Jamaican female sprinters
Afro-Jamaican
Olympic athletes of Jamaica
Athletes (track and field) at the 1964 Summer Olympics
Athletes (track and field) at the 1968 Summer Olympics
Commonwealth Games bronze medallists for Jamaica
Commonwealth Games medallists in athletics
Athletes (track and field) at the 1962 British Empire and Commonwealth Games
Athletes (track and field) at the 1966 British Empire and Commonwealth Games
Athletes (track and field) at the 1970 British Commonwealth Games
Central American and Caribbean Games medalists in athletics
Olympic female sprinters
Deaths from the COVID-19 pandemic in Jamaica
20th-century Jamaican women
Medallists at the 1966 British Empire and Commonwealth Games